is a Japanese manga series by Jasmine Gyuh. It is about three yakuza men forced by their boss to become a female idol group. It was serialized in Kodansha's seinen manga magazine Weekly Young Magazine from March 2015 to September 2018 and was compiled into 12 volumes. The manga is licensed in English by Kodansha USA. A 10-episode anime television series adaptation, produced by J.C.Staff and directed by Chiaki Kon, aired from July to September 2018 on BS11 and other channels. A live-action adaptation, Back Street Girls: Gokudols, was released in February 2019.

Plot
After an unspecified major failure, Yakuza underlings Kentaro, Ryo and Kazuhiko are forced by their boss, Inugane, to either commit seppuku and sell their organs or go to Thailand to undergo sex reassignment surgery, and train to become idols. They choose the latter and debut as Airi, Mari and Chika, the Gokudols. They suffer abuse from Inugane as he trains them to become idols. Still, their hearts are Yakuza, and their brotherhood is strong.

Characters
 /  

Played by: Natsumi Okamoto (Airi), Jin Shirasu (Kentaro)
 Formerly Kentaro Yamamoto, the "Aniki" (Big Brother) of the Yakuza trio. Kentaro was abandoned by his parents and held odd jobs until he joined the Yakuza. He always drinks after a fight. As Airi, she is the leader of the Gokudols and she always gets luxury items as gifts.
 /  

Played by: Ruka Matsuda (Mari), Masato Hanazawa (Ryo)
 Formerly Ryo Tachibana, Kentaro's right-hand man. He is a fan of actor Hitoshi Takamura, collecting his films and even trying to give herself to him as Mari (which didn't work out). As Mari, she is considered the cool member of the trio. She always gets fan letters, which attracts the jealousy of the others, Chika especially. She hates sweets, to the point of breaking up with his previous girlfriend over it. Mari's ex-Yakuza father is transgender. She also suffers butt problems, notably hemorrhoids.
 /  

Played by: Akane Sakanoue (Chika), Reiya Masaki (Kazuhiko)
 Formerly Kazuhiko Sugihara, the youngest of Kentaro's Yakuza trio. As Chika, she is the ditsy one. She had a girlfriend as Kazuhiko, whom she caught with another man at one of their concerts. She always gets cute items, much to Mari's irritation, and occasionally slips "cute" idol words, again much to the others' irritation. It took a long time for his/her father to acknowledge him/her after transitioning.
 / 

 A Mafia member sent from the US to research the Gokudols, having also undergone gender reassignment surgery for similar reasons. However, the research plan was scrapped, and Lina was left to Inugane's hands, much to her shock.
 

Played by: Koichi Iwaki
The idol-obsessed leader of the Inugane Yakuza Group. He forced his screw up underlings to undergo gender reassignment surgery to become idols. His wife is former enka singer Natsuko Tanaka, who ironically hates idols. He bullies his underlings with threats and actual physical violence.

A producer and self-proclaimed "girlology" master. He shapes the girls into idols, though he's not usually successful due to being left in the dark about their secret.

The yakuza trio's captain. He was imprisoned by their blunder.

Played by: Tetsuya Sugaya
The Gokudols' gopher or servant boy. Initially Kazu's underling, their friendship turned sour when he was revealed to be Chika's fan, to the point of her face being on his briefs.

Secretly the wife of Boss Inugane. A famous enka singer who hates idols after they eclipsed her in popularity.

Played by: Arisa Komiya
The new trainee member of the Gokudols. She's a very cheerful and upbeat girl who held the Gokudols in high regard, much to Inugane's pleasure and the trio's bewilderment.

Media

Manga
Back Street Girls is written and illustrated by Jasmine Gyuh. It was serialized in Kodansha's Weekly Young Magazine from March 16, 2015 to September 15, 2018. Kodansha published 12 tankōbon volumes between August 6, 2015 and January 3, 2019. The manga is licensed in English by Kodansha USA.

Anime
An anime television series adaptation, produced by J.C.Staff and directed by Chiaki Kon, aired between July 4 and September 5, 2018 on BS11 and other channels. The scripts were handled by Susumu Yamakawa, and sound direction was handled by Jin Aketagawa. The anime has been licensed by Netflix.

Live-action

A live-action film, titled Back Street Girls: Gokudols and directed by Keinosuke Hara, premiered on February 8, 2019 in Japan. The staff and cast of the film also returned for a six-episode live-action television series that premiered on February 17, 2019.

References

External links
Back Street Girls at Weekly Young Magazine 
Anime official website 

2010s animated comedy television series
Anime series based on manga
Comedy anime and manga
Japanese comedy television series
Japanese idols in anime and manga
Japanese LGBT-related animated television series
J.C.Staff
Kodansha manga
Mainichi Broadcasting System original programming
Manga adapted into television series
Netflix original anime
Seinen manga
Tokyo MX original programming
Transgender in anime and manga
Yakuza in anime and manga